Six Points is an unincorporated community in Washington Township, Hendricks County, Indiana. Its name refers to the junction of two streets and a railroad.

Geography

References

Unincorporated communities in Hendricks County, Indiana
Unincorporated communities in Indiana
Indianapolis metropolitan area